The 2002 Alamo Bowl featured the Colorado Buffaloes and the Wisconsin Badgers.

Colorado got on the board first, following a 91-yard interception return by Colorado cornerback Donald Strickland. Anthony Davis scored Wisconsin's first points, as he rushed 7 yards for a touchdown, to tie the game at 7. Colorado quarterback Robert Hodge threw a 10-yard touchdown pass to wide receiver D. J. Hackett, to give Colorado a 14–7 lead.

Brooks Bollinger connected with wide receiver Brandon Williams for a 10-yard touchdown pass to tie the game at 14. He later threw a 7-yard touchdown pass to Darrin Charles to give Wisconsin a 21–14 lead, that held during halftime. Chris Brown rushed four yards for a touchdown in the third quarter, to tie the game at 21.

Zac Colvin threw an 11-yard touchdown pass to Hackett to give Colorado a 28–21 lead. In the fourth quarter, Bollinger rushed one yard for a touchdown to tie the game at 28 in the final minute. The game headed into overtime, where the Wisconsin defense pushed Colorado backward, forcing them to take a 45-yard FG, which missed wide right.  Wisconsin then just needed to stay in FG range, and Mike Allen kicked a 37-yard field goal to win the game for Wisconsin, 31–28.

References

External links
 Review of game by USA Today

Alamo Bowl
Alamo Bowl
Colorado Buffaloes football bowl games
Wisconsin Badgers football bowl games
Alamo Bowl
December 2002 sports events in the United States